Maddelagudem Village is a village in Jangaon district (part of Telangana Plateau) of Telangana state, India. 

Villages in Jangaon district